W. Samuel Patten is an American political consultant and lobbyist who received international attention in spring 2018 in relation to the Special Counsel investigation led by former FBI director Robert Mueller. This was due to Patten's relationship with Konstantin Kilimnik, a subject of the investigation. In summer 2018, attention intensified due to Patten's emergence as a subject of the investigation in his own right, followed by his guilty plea, after being charged in August 2018 with violating the Foreign Agents Registration Act for failing to register as a foreign agent with the Justice Department when he represented the Opposition Bloc, a Ukrainian political party, from 2014 through 2018.

Early life and family 
Patten's father is Bill Patten Jr., whose mother was the Washington, D.C., socialite Susan Mary Alsop; Patten Jr.'s father was later alleged to have been the British politician Duff Cooper, with whom his mother had an affair while married to her first husband Bill Patten. Patten Jr. moved to Maine, where he published a small-town weekly newspaper in Camden and became a prison minister.

Patten grew up in Maine and went to school there. He graduated from Georgetown University in Washington, D.C., in 1993. While at Georgetown he became close to his famous grandmother Susan Mary Alsop, and was once wounded while defending her from muggers. He married in 2013.

Career 

Patten began his political career in Maine, as an intern for Senator William Cohen and as press secretary for Susan Collins during her campaigns for governor (1994) and senator (1996). In 1999 he moved to Washington, D.C., where he worked for Senators Collins and Olympia Snowe. He was the Maine campaign director for the George W. Bush presidential campaign in 2000. From 2001 to 2004 Patten headed the Moscow office of the International Republican Institute; while there he worked with Konstantin Kilimnik, who later moved to Kiev to work for Paul Manafort's consulting business in Ukraine. Patten worked for the U.S. State Department in 2008. In 2012, he advised Rob Sobhani on his U.S. Senate campaign in Maryland.

In the mid-to-late 1990s, Patten did public affairs work for the Kazakhstan oil sector. Around 2012, he was being paid $30,000 per month by Bidzina Ivanishvili and a firm related to Ivanishvili. In 2014, Patten was receiving $20,000 per month from Iraqi Deputy Prime Minister Saleh al-Mutlaq and the Al-Arabiya Coalition, to support al-Mutlaq's run for prime minister.

In 2014, Patten was a senior consultant for SCL Group, the parent company of Cambridge Analytica, working at their Oregon office to help them fine-tune their models for the 2014 U.S. mid-term elections. He also helped SCL Group with their work on the 2015 Nigeria elections, including hiring Israeli hackers to find kompromat on presidential candidate Muhammadu Buhari.

Patten and Kilimnik founded Begemot Ventures International (BVI) in February 2015. Based in Washington, D.C., BVI is "a strategic and political advisory firm" that Patten claims only has clients outside the United States.

Guilty plea 

 
In August 2018, Patten was charged with violating the Foreign Agents Registration Act for failing to register as a foreign agent with the Justice Department when he represented the Opposition Bloc, a Ukrainian political party, from 2014 through 2018. In the statement of the offense, Kilimnik is identified as "Foreigner A", Begemot Ventures International as "Company A", and Serhiy Lyovochkin as "Foreigner B".

The prosecution against Patten was an outgrowth of work by the Special Counsel investigation, which referred the matter to the U.S. Attorney's Office for the District of Columbia and the Criminal Division of the Justice Department, which handled the prosecution. Additionally, after Patten was interviewed by Senate Intelligence Committee staff, "the Committee made a criminal referral to the Department of Justice" because of "concerns about certain statements made by Mr. Patten." In his subsequent guilty plea, Patten admitted to lying to the Intelligence Committee, although the crime to which Patten admitted guilt did not relate directly to his statements to the committee.

As part of his guilty plea, Patten admitted that he laundered a $50,000 contribution from Kilimnik to the Trump inauguration committee, by having the money transferred from a Cypriot bank to his company and from there to an unnamed American who sent it to the committee. According to the charge, Patten knew that it was illegal for a foreign national to give money to the committee. He also admitted that he lied to a Congressional committee about the inauguration donation and about his foreign lobbying work, and that he intentionally destroyed documents about that work.

On April 12, 2019, Patten was sentenced to three years' probation, 500 hours of community service and a $5000 fine.

See also
Mueller Report
Russian interference in the 2016 United States elections

References 

Living people
American political consultants
Georgetown University alumni
American lobbyists
Place of birth missing (living people)
People associated with Russian interference in the 2016 United States elections
Maine Republicans
1971 births